Bolshebadrakovo (Olo Baźraq) is a rural locality (a village) in Badrakovsky Selsoviet, Burayevsky District, Bashkortostan, Russia. The population was 430 in 2010. There are ten streets.

Geography 
Bolshebadrakovo is located 20 km southwest of Burayevo (the district's administrative centre) by road. Malobadrakovo is the nearest rural locality.

References 

Rural localities in Burayevsky District